The Oakura River is a river of the Taranaki Region of New Zealand's North Island. It flows north from the slopes of Taranaki/Mount Egmont, veering northwest before reaching the Tasman Sea at Oakura, southwest of New Plymouth. On this way it goes by Ōakura and the historical Oakura Pa.

See also
List of rivers of New Zealand

References

Rivers of Taranaki
Rivers of New Zealand